Wuda may refer to:

 Wuda District, Wuhai, China
 Wuda (wasp)
 Wuhan University, abbreviated as Wuda in Chinese
 Wuda Railway, a section of Wuhan–Jiujiang Railway
 Wuda, a village in Meichuan, Wuxue, Huanggang, Hubei
  What’s Up DA